National Highway 157A, commonly referred to as NH 157A is a national highway in India. It is a secondary route of National Highway 57.  NH-157A runs in the state of Odisha in India.

Route 
NH157A connects Phulbani, Jamujhari, Dutimendi, Khajuripada and Madhapur in the state of Odisha.

Junctions  
 
  Terminal near Phulbani.
  Terminal near Madhapur.

See also 
 List of National Highways in India
 List of National Highways in India by state

References

External links 

 NH 157A on OpenStreetMap

National highways in India
National Highways in Odisha